John Sampen (born 1949) is an American classical saxophonist.

Sampen's degrees are from Northwestern University (B.M., 1971; M.M., 1972; and Doctor of Music, 1984). His teachers included Frederick Hemke, Larry Teal, and Donald Sinta. He has served as professor of saxophone at Bowling Green State University in Bowling Green, Ohio since 1977. His wife is the composer and pianist Marilyn Shrude.

Sampen plays all types of the saxophone. He specializes in new music, and has commissioned over 60 new works for these instruments, from composers such as Samuel Adler, William Albright, Milton Babbitt, William Bolcom, John Cage, Michael Colgrass, John Harbison, Donald Martino, Ryo Noda, Pauline Oliveros, Bernard Rands, Gunther Schuller, Elliott Schwartz, Marilyn Shrude, Morton Subotnick, and Vladimir Ussachevsky.

Partial discography
Sampen, John: The Electric Saxophone. Works by Bunce, Cage, Furman, Mobberley, Shrude, Tower, and Ussachevsky. Brooklyn, New York: Capstone Records, CPS-8636, 1997.
Sampen, John and Marilyn Shrude: Shadows and Dawning. Works by Albright, Beerman, and Shrude. Albany, New York: Albany Records, Troy526, 2002.
Sampen, John and Marilyn Shrude: Visions in Metaphor. Works by John Adams, Milton Babbitt, Karel Husa, Pauline Oliveros, William Albright, Samuel Adler, Marilyn Shrude, Bernard Rands, Philip Glass, and Joan Tower. Albany, New York: Albany Records, Troy442, 2001.

Notable students
James Umble, saxophone professor at Youngstown State University
Brent Bristow, Professor of Music, Director of Bands, and Professor of Saxophone at Arkansas State University Beebe
Michael Ibrahim, saxophone professor at West Virginia University
Scotty Stepp, Professor of Saxophone at DePauw University, Indiana University, and the University of Indianapolis
Susan Cook, saxophone professor at Depaul University
Russell Peterson, saxophone professor at Concordia College
Michael Holmes, Artist-Teacher of Saxophone and Head of Woodwinds at Roosevelt University Chicago College of Performing Arts and Director of Marketing for the North American Saxophone Alliance
Joseph Murphy, saxophone professor at Mansfield University
Ryan Muncy, Executive Director of Ensemble dal Niente, Chicago, IL
Shannon Ford, freelance saxophonist and member of Sax 4th Avenue
Christopher Blossom, saxophonist with the United States Army Field Band
Adrienne Welker, saxophonist with the United States Navy Band
David Babich, saxophonist with the United States Navy Band
Jeff Heisler, saxophone professor at Oakland University
James Fusik, saxophone professor at Wayne State University
 Andrew Braet, saxophonist with the Band of the Irish Guards, British Army
Noa Even, saxophone professor at Kent State University
Matthew Younglove, saxophone professor at Tennessee Tech University
Rhonda Taylor, saxophone professor at New Mexico State University
Cody Greenwell, saxophone professor at California State University, Bakersfield

External links
John Sampen official site

Classical saxophonists
American classical saxophonists
American male saxophonists
Living people
1949 births
Contemporary classical music performers
Bienen School of Music alumni
Bowling Green State University faculty
21st-century American saxophonists
21st-century American male musicians